Joan Barbarà Mata (born 23 July 1966) is a Spanish retired footballer who played as a forward.

He appeared in 295 Segunda División matches over nine seasons, scoring a combined 66 goals for Sabadell and Salamanca. He represented both clubs in La Liga, in a 17-year professional career.

Playing career
Born in L'Hospitalet de Llobregat, Barcelona, Catalonia, Barbarà made his senior debuts with local amateurs UE Sants. In the 1986 off-season he moved to La Liga with CE Sabadell FC, playing his first game in the competition on 17 December 1986 in a 1–1 home draw against Real Betis where he came on as a 72nd-minute substitute; his first goal arrived the following 17 May, helping the hosts defeat Cádiz CF 2–0.

In June 1993, after being relegated from Segunda División, Barbarà signed with UD Salamanca. He scored 13 goals in his second season, helping the Castile and León club promote to the top level after a 12-year absence. He netted a further 12 in the following campaign, but could not avoid his team's relegation; during his stint with the Charros, he was also captain.

In the summer of 2001, aged 34, Barbarà left Salamanca and joined UE Lleida in Segunda División B. A year later he moved to fellow league side CE L'Hospitalet, and subsequently retired at the end of 2002–03.

Coaching career
After retiring, Barbarà started working in FC Barcelona's youth squads. He subsequently served as FC Barcelona B's scout during Pep Guardiola's spell, and in 2008 was appointed as the reserves' assistant manager.

Barbarà acted as both Luis Enrique and Eusebio Sacristán's assistant and, after the appointment of the former to the main squad in 2014, he was hired as auxiliary coach.

References

External links

1966 births
Living people
Footballers from L'Hospitalet de Llobregat
Spanish footballers
Association football forwards
La Liga players
Segunda División players
Segunda División B players
Divisiones Regionales de Fútbol players
UE Sants players
CE Sabadell FC footballers
UD Salamanca players
UE Lleida players
CE L'Hospitalet players
Catalonia international footballers
FC Barcelona non-playing staff